Gusfand Guyeh (also Romanized as Gūsfand Gūyeh) is a village in Rahimabad Rural District, Rahimabad District, Rudsar County, Gilan Province, Iran. At the 2006 census, its population was 74, in 17 families.

References 

Populated places in Rudsar County